Płacheta is a surname. Notable people with the surname include:

Alexander Placheta (born 1967), Austrian swimmer
Marcin Płacheta (born 1979), Polish bobsledder
Przemysław Płacheta (born 1998), Polish footballer

See also
 

Polish-language surnames